The Árni Magnússon Institute for Icelandic Studies is an institute of the Ministry of Education, Science and Culture of Iceland which conducts research in Icelandic and related academic studies, in particular the Icelandic language and Icelandic literature, to disseminate knowledge in those areas, and to protect and develop the collections that it possesses or those placed in its care. It is named after Árni Magnússon, a 17th–18th century collector of medieval Icelandic manuscripts.

The Árni Magnússon Institute was an academic institute located in Reykjavík, Iceland. The institute had the task of preserving and studying mediaeval Icelandic manuscripts containing Landnáma, Heimskringla and the Icelandic sagas. On 1 September 2006, this institute was merged with the Icelandic Language Institute, the University of Iceland Institute of Lexicography, the Sigurður Nordal Institute, and the Place-Name Institute of Iceland to create the current Árni Magnússon Institute for Icelandic Studies. It is a university institution with its own board and financing. The Minister of Education, Science and Culture appoints a five-member board for four-year terms. Three members are appointed according to nomination by the University Senate and two without nomination, with one of those two acting as chairman. The minister appoints a director for five-year terms on the recommendation of the board.

Dr. Vésteinn Ólason was appointed director of the Institute of Icelandic Studies on 12 September 2006. Vésteinn had been the director of the Árni Magnússon Institute from 1 May 1999 until 1 September 2006, after which it was merged with four other institutes to create the Árni Magnússon Institute for Icelandic Studies. Professor Guðrún Nordal took over as director of the institute on 1 March 2009, appointed for a period of five years.

History 

After Iceland received home rule from the Danish government in 1904, the Icelandic parliament (Alþingi) began to petition for the return to Iceland of at least a significant portion of the Arnamagnæan Manuscript Collection, the manuscripts and other documents collected in the late 17th and early 18th centuries by the Icelandic antiquarian and scholar Árni Magnússon. In 1927–28 four manuscripts and some 700 charters and other legal documents were returned to the Icelandic National Archives. In 1962 a special institute was set up under the name Handritastofnun Íslands (English: "Icelandic Manuscript Institute"). Ten years later, after the transfer of manuscripts from Copenhagen had begun in earnest, the laws concerning the institute were changed and it was renamed Stofnun Árna Magnússonar á Íslandi (generally referred to as Árnastofnun). It was administratively associated with the University of Iceland until 1 September 2006, when it merged with four other institutes in Iceland to create a larger independent institute of Icelandic studies, the Árni Magnússon Institute for Icelandic Studies.

Location 
The institute has long been located in the Árnagarður building on the campus of the University of Iceland by Suðurgata in Reykjavík, though the organisations that were merged into the institute in 2006 continued to be based at different sites in Reykjavík. In 2005, the Alþingi approved the construction of a purpose-built Hús íslenskunnar ('House of Icelandic') or Hús íslenskra fræða ('House of Icelandic Studies') to house the whole Institute, standing on the other side of Suðurgata, beside the National Library of Iceland. Ground was broken in 2013 and a large hole dug before building work was temporarily halted following a change of government; the hole came to be known as the 'hola íslenskra fræða' ('hole of Icelandic studies'). On 7 May 2019 it was declared that work would resume.

Manuscripts 
The institute houses a number of historically and culturally important manuscripts, the bulk of them from the Arnamagnæan Manuscript Collection. Among these are: 
AM 113 fol (the Íslendingabók)
AM 371 4to (the Landnámabók)
AM 738 4to (Edda oblongata)
GKS 1005 fol (the Flateyjarbók)
GKS 2365 4to (Codex Regius of the Poetic Edda)
GKS 2367 4to (Codex Regius of the Prose Edda)
Icelandic Manuscript, SÁM 66

See also
 Arnamagnæan Institute, the institution in Copenhagen housing the remainder of the Árni Magnússon collection

References

External links 
  Árni Magnússon Institute’s Official Website
  Online manuscript facsimiles
   Árni Magnússon Institute

Icelandic language
Libraries in Iceland
Culture in Reykjavík